Bleptinodes is a genus of moths of the family Erebidae. The genus was erected by George Hampson in 1925.

Species
Bleptinodes borbonica de Joannis, 1932 Reunion
Bleptinodes perumbrosa (Hampson, 1898) Meghalaya
Bleptinodes tanaocrossa Prout, 1928 Borneo

References

Hypeninae